4-Ethyl-alpha-Pyrrolidinovalerophenone (4-Et-PVP) is a recreational designer drug from the substituted cathinone family, with stimulant effects. It was first identified in Hungary in March 2019.

See also 
 3F-PVP
 4-EMC
 4-Ethylamphetamine
 4F-PVP
 4Cl-PVP
 MOPVP
 DMPVP
 MDPV
 Pyrovalerone
 RTI-83

References 

Pyrrolidinophenones
Designer drugs
Serotonin-norepinephrine-dopamine releasing agents